The Brains of the Cosmos is a Man or Astro-man? 7" EP released on Demolition Derby Records in 1994 and pressed exclusively on black vinyl only. The cover claims this is the "first ever disc entirely recorded in outer space".

Track listing

Side A
"Electrostatic Brain Field"
"Mach One"

Side B
"XL-3 (Mezzo Mix)"
"Cowboy Playing Dead (live)"

Line Up
Star Crunch - Illegal Temporal Lobe Telemarketing and Positronic Guitar Simulation
Coco the Electronic Monkey Wizard - Digitally Enhanced Wernicke's Area with Passive Matrix Screen
Dr. Deleto and His Invisible Vaportron - Low Frequency Therapy (5-15 Hz) for Random Inflammation of the Hypothalamus
Birdstuff - Full Frontal Lobotomy

References

Man or Astro-man? EPs
1994 EPs